NEK or Nek may refer to:

People 
 Ndri Elise Kangah (born 1983), Ivorian team handball goalkeeper and participated at the 2011 World Women's Handball Championship in Brazil
 Nicole El Karoui (born 1944), French-Tunisian mathematician (maiden name "Nicole Schvartz")
 Nasir El Kasmi (born 1982), Moroccan football player who is currently a free agent
 Nelson E. Kauffman (1904–1984), bishop, pastor and leader of the (old) Mennonite Church
 Neel E. Kearby (1911–1944), U.S. Army Air Corps Colonel and P-47 Thunderbolt pilot in World War II
 Nathan E. Kendall (1868–1936), American Republican politician, two-term U.S. Representative from Iowa's 6th congressional district and the 23rd Governor of Iowa
 Nicholas Egbert Knight (1866–1946), American Republican politician, member of the South Dakota House of Representatives
 Nancy E. Krulik, author of more than 200 books for children and young adults, including three New York Times bestsellers
 Nawal El Kuwaitia (born 1966), well-known female singer and musical icon in the Middle East, known as Shaikhat Al Tarab (The Queen of Classic Music) and Qaitharat Al Khaleej (Harp of Khaliji Song)
 Nikolai Efimovich Kuznetsov (1879–1970), Russian-Soviet painter and theatre designer
 Florin Necşoiu, Manele singer, with stage name N.E.K..
 Filippo Neviani, (born 1972), Italian singer, with stage name Nek.

Places 
 North East Khawdungsei, Champhai district of Mizoram, India
 Northeast Kingdom, the north-easternmost area in the U.S. state of Vermont
 "The Nek", a narrow stretch of ridge on the Gallipoli Peninsula and the site of the WWI Battle of the Nek

Organizations 
 Krško Nuclear Power Plant (Nuklearna elektrarna Krško), located in Vrbina in the Municipality of Krško, Slovenia
 NEK EAD (Natsionalna Elektricheska Kompania), a single-owner joint-stock electric company headquartered in Sofia, Bulgaria
 New England Knights, a minor league football team in the North American Football League NAFL
 Norsk Elektroteknisk Komite, the Norwegian Electrotechnical Committee
 North Elbian Evangelical Lutheran Church (Nordelbische Evangelisch-Lutherische Kirche), a Lutheran regional church in Northern Germany

Other uses 
 Battle of the Nek, a World War I battle
 Neck (water spirit), mythological creature
 Nek language, language in Papua New Guinea